Jitse is a Dutch given name. Notable people with the name include: 

Jitse Groen (born 1978), Dutch billionaire businessman, founder of Takeaway.com 
Jitse van der Veen (1928–1976), Dutch swimmer

Dutch given names